The Ministry of Employment is a ministry in the Swedish government responsible for labour market, labour law and the work environment. The Ministry is also responsible for the work of advancing gender equality and human rights at national level. Moreover, the Ministry is responsible for efforts to increase integration, combat segregation, racism and discrimination, and strengthen the rights of children and LGBT people.

The Swedish Ministry of Employment has two ministers as of November 2022. The Minister for Employment and Integration, Johan Pehrson, is head of the Ministry. Paulina Brandberg is Minister for Gender Equality and Deputy Minister for Employment. The ministers also have political advisers on staff who assist them in policy work, providing background material, political assessments, planning and coordination, and media contacts.

The Ministry has an Office of the Director-General for Administrative Affairs, two secretariats and six divisions, which are led by non-politically appointed officials.

History 
The Ministry of Employment was established in 1974, when the Ministry of the Interior was split into two new ministries. The Ministry of Employment assumed responsibility for labour market, labour protection and immigration issues. Housing policies were transferred to a new Ministry of Housing.

On January 1, 1999 the responsibilities of the Ministry of Employment were transferred to the new Ministry of Enterprise, Energy and Communications.

On January 1, 2007, the ministry was reinstituted after a decision by the new government that took office on October 6, 2006.

Areas of responsibility 
 Introduction of new arrivals
 Labour law and work environment
 Labour market
Gender equality
Children's rights 
Democracy and human rights

Government agencies 
The Ministry of Employment is principal for the following government agencies:

References

External links 
 Ministry of Employment, official website 
 Arbetsmarknadsdepartementet, official website 

Employment
Sweden
Ministries established in 1974
Labor in Sweden